Kosmos 369 ( meaning Cosmos 369), known before launch as DS-P1-Yu No.42, was a Soviet satellite which was launched in 1970 as part of the Dnepropetrovsk Sputnik programme. It was a  spacecraft, which was built by the Yuzhnoye Design Bureau, and was used as a radar calibration target for anti-ballistic missile tests.

Launch 
The launch of Kosmos 369 took place from Site 133/1 at the Plesetsk Cosmodrome, and used a Kosmos-2I 63SM carrier rocket. The launch occurred at 15:10:03 UTC on 8 October 1970, and successfully deployed Kosmos 369 into low Earth orbit. Upon reaching orbit, it was assigned its Kosmos designation, and received the International Designator 1970-081A.

Orbit 
Kosmos 369 was the thirty-sixth of seventy nine DS-P1-Yu satellites to be launched, and the thirty-third of seventy two to successfully reach orbit. It remained in orbit until it decayed and reentered the atmosphere on 22 January 1971.

References

Kosmos satellites
Spacecraft launched in 1970
1970 in the Soviet Union
Dnepropetrovsk Sputnik program